Jazz Waltz is an album by American jazz trumpeter, composer and arranger Shorty Rogers, released on the Reprise label in 1963.

Reception

On All About Jazz Dave Rickert said "the novelty of ¾ time in music is still fresh even today and Joe Mondragon and Mel Lewis create a seemingly infinite variety of ways to swing in waltz time. Rogers contributes a few catchy melodies (in particular the title track) and creates lovely charts". Allmusic noted "Shorty Rogers' Jazz Waltz is exactly that, an exploration of ten compositions played in waltz settings. Only these big-band charts are hardly the waltzes heard on Lawrence Welk's long-running television series".

Track listing 
All compositions by Shorty Rogers except where noted.
 "I'm Gonna Go Fishin'" (Duke Ellington, Peggy Lee) - 4:31
 "Greensleeves" (Traditional) - 5:26
 "Walk on the Wild Side" (Elmer Bernstein) - 4:15
 "Witchcraft" (Cy Coleman, Carolyn Leigh) - 2:55
 "Be as Children" - 3:33
 "Jazz Waltz" - 4:05
 "Echoes of Harlem" (Ellington) - 4:39
 "A Taste of Honey" (Ric Marlowe, Bobby Scott) - 2:51
 "Terrence's Farewell" - 3:32
 "The Streets of Laredo" - 4:06

Personnel 
Shorty Rogers - flugelhorn, arranger, conductor
Joe Burnett, Ollie Mitchell - trumpet, flugelhorn
Al Porcino, Ray Triscari - trumpet (tracks 1, 3, 5 & 6)
Milt Bernhardt, Harry Betts - trombone (tracks 1, 3, 5 & 6)
George Roberts (tracks 1, 3, 5 & 6), Kenneth Shroyer - bass trombone
Paul Horn, Bud Shank - alto saxophone, flute
Joe Manis - alto saxophone (tracks 1, 3, 5 & 6)
Bill Perkins - tenor saxophone (tracks 1, 3, 5 & 6) 
 Bill Hood - baritone saxophone (tracks 1, 3, 5 & 6) 
Pete Jolly - piano
Joe Mondragon - bass
Larry Bunker (tracks 1, 3, 5 & 6), Emil Richards (tracks 2, 4 & 7-10) - vibraphone
Mel Lewis - drums

References 

Shorty Rogers albums
1963 albums
Reprise Records albums
Albums arranged by Shorty Rogers